Ramon Moncho Carranza Lazo (born c. 1940 in Barquisimeto — c. 2003) was a Venezuelan self-taught jazz saxophonist and composer.

Biography

Early life and career
""Moncho"" started his career at an early age in Barquisimeto with drums and trumpet. He later developed an interest for the clarinet, motivated by Ugo Stegnani. He occupied outstanding spots in famous regional orchestras, such as the Orquesta Filarmonica de Lara.
He moves to Caracas to further develop his Saxophone skills.
From 1979 to 1984, he was part of the Orquesta Filarmonica de Caracas, and invited many times to play with the Orquesta Sinfonica de Venezuela and the Orquesta Sinfonica Municipal.

Projects and fellow musicians
He was involved in several musical projects in his life long career:
 Festival "Onda Nueva" - Aldemaro Romero, Dave Grusig, Tom Scott, Joe Sample, Zimbo Trio, Milton Nascimento, Ástor Piazzolla, Paul Muriat, Paquito D'Rivera.

Discography
 Carranza Jazz (1996)
 Carranza Jazz Vol 2 (2001)

See also
Venezuela
Venezuelan music

External links
 Carranza Jazz Record Info
 Carranza Jazz Vol 2 Record Info

1940s births
2003 deaths
People from Barquisimeto
Venezuelan classical musicians
Venezuelan composers
Male composers
Venezuelan folk musicians
Venezuelan jazz musicians
Venezuelan pianists
20th-century pianists
Male pianists
20th-century male musicians
Male jazz musicians